The canton of Bourg-Argental is a French former administrative division located in the department of Loire and the Rhone-Alpes region. It was disbanded following the French canton reorganisation which came into effect in March 2015. It consisted of 8 communes, which joined the new canton of Le Pilat in 2015. It had 6,685 inhabitants (2012).

The canton comprised the following communes:

Bourg-Argental
Burdignes
Colombier
Graix
Saint-Julien-Molin-Molette
Saint-Sauveur-en-Rue
Thélis-la-Combe
La Versanne

See also
Cantons of the Loire department

References

Former cantons of Loire (department)
2015 disestablishments in France
States and territories disestablished in 2015